Zero to the power of zero, denoted by , is a mathematical expression that is either defined as 1 or left undefined, depending on context.  In algebra and combinatorics, one typically defines  .  In mathematical analysis, the expression is sometimes left undefined. Computer programming languages and software also have differing ways of handling this expression.

Discrete exponents
All three of these specialize to give .

Polynomials and power series
A (real) polynomial is an expression of the form , where  is an indeterminate, and the coefficients  are real numbers. Polynomials are added termwise, and multiplied by applying the distributive law and the usual rules for exponents. With these operations, polynomials form a ring . Also, polynomials can be evaluated by specializing  to a real number. More precisely, for any given real number , there is a unique unital -algebra homomorphism  such that . Because  is unital, . That is,  for each real number , including 0. The same argument applies with  replaced by any ring.

Defining  is necessary for many polynomial identities.  For example, the binomial theorem  holds for  only if .

For example, identities like  and  hold for  only if .

In order for the polynomial  to define a continuous function , one must define .

Continuous exponents

Limits involving algebraic operations can often be evaluated by replacing subexpressions by their limits; if the resulting expression does not determine the original limit, the expression is known as an indeterminate form.

This and more general results can be obtained by studying the limiting behavior of the function .

Complex exponents

History

As a value
In 1752, Euler in Introductio in analysin infinitorum wrote that  and explicitly mentioned that . An annotation attributed to Mascheroni in a 1787 edition of Euler's book Institutiones calculi differentialis offered the "justification" 

as well as another more involved justification. In the 1830s, Libri published several further arguments attempting to justify the claim , though these were far from convincing, even by standards of rigor at the time.

As a limiting form

He deduced that the limit of the full two-variable function  without a specified constraint is "indeterminate". With this justification, he listed  along with expressions like  in a table of indeterminate forms.

Apparently unaware of Cauchy's work, Möbius in 1834, building on Pfaff's argument, claimed incorrectly that  whenever  as  approaches a number  (presumably  is assumed positive away from ).

Current situation
 Some authors define  as  because it simplifies many theorem statements. According to Benson (1999), "The choice whether to define  is based on convenience, not on correctness. If we refrain from defining , then certain assertions become unnecessarily awkward. ... The consensus is to use the definition , although there are textbooks that refrain from defining ." Knuth (1992) contends more strongly that  "has to be "; he draws a distinction between the value , which should equal , and the limiting form  (an abbreviation for a limit of  where ), which is an indeterminate form: "Both Cauchy and Libri were right, but Libri and his defenders did not understand why truth was on their side."
 Other authors leave  undefined because  is an indeterminate form:  does not imply .

There do not seem to be any authors assigning  a specific value other than 1.

Treatment on computers

IEEE floating-point standard
The IEEE 754-2008 floating-point standard is used in the design of most floating-point libraries. It recommends a number of operations for computing a power: 
powr treats  as NaN (Not-a-Number) due to the indeterminate form; see .

The pow variant is inspired by the pow function from C99, mainly for compatibility. It is useful mostly for languages with a single power function. The pown and powr variants have been introduced due to conflicting usage of the power functions and the different points of view (as stated above).

Programming languages
But for C, as of C99, if the normative annex F is supported, the result for real floating-point types is required to be  because there are significant applications for which this value is more useful than NaN (for instance, with discrete exponents); the result on complex types is not specified, even if the informative annex G is supported. Some languages document that their exponentiation operation corresponds to the pow function from the C mathematical library; this is the case with Lua and Perl's ** operator (where it is explicitly mentioned that the result of 0**0 is platform-dependent).

Mathematical and scientific software
SageMath does not simplify .

References

External links

 sci.math FAQ: What is ?
 What does  (zero to the zeroth power) equal? on AskAMathematician.com

Exponentials
Mathematical analysis
Computer arithmetic
Computer errors
0 (number)
Software anomalies
1 (number)